Syrnola capensis is a species of sea snail, a marine gastropod mollusk in the family Pyramidellidae, the pyrams and their allies.

Description
The length of the shell measures 10 mm.

Distribution
This marine species occurs of Algoa Bay, Port Alfred and KwaZuluNatal, South Africa.

References

External links
 To World Register of Marine Species

Pyramidellidae
Gastropods described in 1892